Duke Zhao may refer to these ancient Chinese rulers:

Duke Zhao of Qi (died 613 BC)
Duke Zhao of Jin (died 526 BC)

See also
King Zhao (disambiguation)
Duke of Shao (died  1000 BC), sometimes translated as Duke Shao or Duke Zhao